Curtius is a lunar impact crater that is located in the southern part of the Moon. From the Earth the crater appears foreshortened, making it more difficult to observe detail. Nevertheless, this is a large crater that can be readily found in even small telescopes. Curtius is located within one crater diameter of the still-larger Moretus to the southwest. To the northeast is the smaller Pentland. Curtius is 95 kilometers in diameter and 6.8 kilometers deep. It is from the Nectarian period, 3.92 to 3.85 billion years ago.

It is named after Albert Curtz.

Background
The outer rim of Curtius has been softened due to impact erosion, but it retains much of its original structure. Along the north and northwest parts of the rim are a pair of notable outward bulges that ruin the overall symmetry of the crater. There is a small satellite crater, Curtius E, lying across the eastern rim, and a small, bowl-shaped craterlet Curtius A along the southern rim.
The interior floor is relatively level, with a low, rounded central peaks near the midpoint. The northern part of the inner wall has extended further into the crater floor than elsewhere, producing a slightly irregular surface. The floor is covered by a number of tiny craterlets, but there are no other impacts of note across the interior.

Satellite craters 

By convention these features are identified on lunar maps by placing the letter on the side of the crater midpoint that is closest to Curtius.

References 

 

Impact craters on the Moon
Nectarian